Kim Eun-ha (born 8 March 1975) is a former professional tennis player from South Korea. A right-handed player, Kim had a serve-and-volley game and was best on hard courts.

Biography

Early life
Kim was born in 1975, one of three daughters of fisherman Young-Soo and housewife Chung In-ja. She began playing tennis while at school at the age of 10 and graduated in 1994, after which she joined the professional tour.

Professional tour
Kim made the singles quarterfinals of the 1997 Danamon Open in Jakarta as a qualifier. Her performances in 1997 brought her ranking into the top 200 and she peaked at 141 in 1998. She won ITF singles titles in Seoul and Shenzhen during her career.

It was in doubles that she had the most success. After winning four ITF doubles events in 1997, Kim appeared in the main draw of all four Grand Slam events in the 1998 season and reached 84 in the world that year. One of those Grand Slam tournaments was the US Open where she and Virág Csurgó beat the American pairing of Jennifer Capriati and Alexandra Stevenson. On the WTA Tour she twice made doubles semi-finals, with Émilie Loit at the 1998 Skoda Czech Open and Jeon Mi-ra in 2001 at the Pattaya Open.

Representative
Kim made her first appearances for the South Korea Fed Cup team in 1995 and was a regular fixture in the side throughout the campaign.

At the 1996 Summer Olympics in Atlanta, Kim was a member of the South Korean squad and featured in the women's doubles draw, with Park Sung-hee. The pair were beaten in the first round by South Africa's Amanda Coetzer and Mariaan De Swardt.

In 1997, South Korea competed in the Fed Cup World Group, having qualified for the first time by beating Bulgaria in the 1996 play-off. Her win over Bulgaria's Antoaneta Pandjerova in the fourth rubber of the play-off had the distinction of securing the World Group spot for South Korea. Their 1997 World Group tie was against Argentina in Seoul and they were beaten 1-4, with Kim losing both a singles and doubles match in three sets.

Her appearances in international competition for South Korea include the 1998 Asian Games and 2001 Summer Universiade. At the Universiade, which was held in Beijing, she won two medals, a silver in the women's doubles and a bronze in the mixed doubles.

ITF Circuit finals

Singles (8–4)

Doubles (15–7)

References

External links
 
 
 

1975 births
Living people
South Korean female tennis players
Tennis players at the 1996 Summer Olympics
Olympic tennis players of South Korea
Tennis players at the 1998 Asian Games
Universiade medalists in tennis
Universiade silver medalists for South Korea
Universiade bronze medalists for South Korea
Asian Games competitors for South Korea
Medalists at the 1999 Summer Universiade
Medalists at the 2001 Summer Universiade